Railway stations in Côte d'Ivoire include:

Maps 
 UN Map
 UNHCR Atlas Map Côte d'Ivoire

Towns served by rail

Existing 
 Abidjan - national capital and port
 Agboville
 Dimbokro - proposed junction
 Bouaké - provincial capital
 Katiola
 Tafiré
 Ferkessédougou - provincial capital, near Burkina Faso border
  Ouangolodougou (Wangolodougou) - near Burkina Faso border.
  Ouangolodougou, Burkina Faso
  Niangoloko, Burkina Faso

Proposed 

  San Pédro - port 
  Man
   Mount Nimba - iron ore
  Bamako

  Dimbokro - junction
  Yamoussoukro - national capital

 On 31 November 2011, an agreement was signed to build a new international railway connecting Côte d'Ivoire, Burkina Faso, Niger and Benin.
 In 2011, there was a proposal to convert the line to standard gauge.

 2015 - Abidjan Metro

2014 
Minister of economic infrastructure proposes a $160 million railway from Ouangolo in northern Ivory Coast to Sikasso in southern Mali.

  Bamako (0 km)
  Bougouni
  Sikasso
 border
  Ouangolodougou (569 km)

2015 
News

2018 
News

See also 
 Transport in Côte d'Ivoire
 Railway stations in Burkina Faso
 Railway stations in Mali - possible connection with West Africa Regional Rail Integration
 Template:Suburban railways in Africa

References 

Rail transport in Ivory Coast
Railway stations
Railway stations
Ivory Coast